KAC or Kac may refer to:

Organizations 
 Kenitra Athletic Club, a football club in Kenitra, Morocco
 Knight's Armament Company, US
 Korea Airports Corporation
 Kosciusko Alpine Club, an Australian ski club

People 
 Eduardo Kac (born 1960), Brazilian-American artist
 Mac Kac (1920–1987), French jazz drummer
 Mark Kac (1914–1984), Polish-American mathematician
 Victor Kac (born 1943), Russian-American mathematician

Places 
 Kać, Novi Sad, South Bačka District, Serbia
 Kenyon Athletic Center, Gambier, Knox County, Ohio, US
 Kiaracondong railway station, Bandung, West Java, Indonesia, code

Other
 ICAO designator for Kuwait Airways

See also
 Kács, Borsod-Abaúj-Zemplén, Hungary
 KACS, a radio station in Washington state, US
 Kach (disambiguation)